Milanlu Rural District is a rural district (dehestan) in the Central District of Esfarayen County, North Khorasan Province, Iran. At the 2006 census, its population was 3,936, in 891 families.  The rural district has the following villages: Anushirvan,  Barastu, Bidvaz, Dar Parchin-e a Olya, Dar Parchin-e Sofla, Ganjdan, Hasanaba, Hesar-e Kazimabad, Jan Ahmadi, Kalateh-ye Habib, Kalateh-ye Pialeh, Karimabad-e Olya, Ordaghan, Parkanlu.

References 

Rural Districts of North Khorasan Province
Esfarayen County